Taiwan Adventist International School (TAIS) is a secondary boarding school operated by the Seventh-day Adventist Church.  It is situated in the midst of rural Nantou County, Taiwan.

It is a part of the Seventh-day Adventist education system, the world's second largest Christian school system.

History
Taiwan Adventist International School is a boarding school operated in North Asia-Pacific Division of Seventh-day Adventists to fill the need of its constituents, missionaries' children, and local, Taiwanese who are looking for Adventist education at the junior high and high school level.
It was established in 2008 by the Adventist Educational Holdings Company to serve the whole of its constituents, and named Taiwan Adventist International School. It opened in August 2008 with eleven (11) teachers and has since grown to 24 faculty and staff.  The first 12th grade graduation was in 2010.

TAIS is located on a 50-hectare (123 acre) campus in central Taiwan.

Curriculum
The schools curriculum consists primarily of the standard courses taught at college preparatory schools across the world. All students are required to take classes in the core areas of English, basic sciences, mathematics, a foreign language, and social sciences.

Spiritual aspects
All students take religion classes each year that they are enrolled. These classes cover topics in biblical history and Christian and denominational doctrines. Instructors in other disciplines also begin each class period with prayer or a short devotional thought, many which encourage student input. Weekly, the entire student body gathers together in the auditorium for an hour-long chapel service.
Outside the classrooms there is year-round spiritually oriented programming that relies on student involvement.

See also

 List of Seventh-day Adventist secondary and elementary schools
 Seventh-day Adventist education
 Seventh-day Adventist Church
 Seventh-day Adventist theology
 History of the Seventh-day Adventist Church
 Taipei Adventist American School
 The Primacy Collegiate Academy

References

External links
Official TAIS website

2008 establishments in Taiwan
Educational institutions established in 2008
High schools in Taiwan
International schools in Taiwan
Secondary schools affiliated with the Seventh-day Adventist Church